Myroslav Serdyuk (born 27 July 1999 in Chernihiv) is a Ukrainian professional footballer who plays as a midfielder for FC Chernihiv in the Ukrainian First League.

Early career
In 2018 he played for Desna-2 Chernihiv, the reserve squad of Desna Chernihiv, making 44 appearances and scoring four goals.

Career
On 23 August 2022 he signed for FC Chernihiv in the Ukrainian First League. On 27 August he made his Ukrainian First League debut against Skoruk Tomakivka. On 24 November 2022, he scores his first goal in Ukrainian First League, against Hirnyk-Sport Horishni Plavni at the Yunist Stadium in Horishni Plavni.

Career statistics

Club

References

External links
 Mykola Syrash at FC Chernihiv 
 

1999 births
Living people
Footballers from Chernihiv
FC Yunist Chernihiv players
SDYuShOR Desna players
FC Desna-2 Chernihiv players
FC Chernihiv players
Ukrainian footballers
Association football midfielders
Ukrainian First League players